The 2016 CECAFA Women's Championship was the second edition of the association football tournament for women's national teams in the East African region. The first edition was hosted in 1986 and won by Zanzibar.

It was held in Jinja, Uganda between 11 and 20 September 2016. There were no sponsors besides the Uganda Football Association.

Participants

The seven participants were announced on 29 August 2016.

Sudan and South Sudan were initially reported as having confirmed participation, but did not appear in the draw. Equally not in the draw were Namibia, Zimbabwe and Malawi, who had requested guest spots.

Draw
The draw was announced on 29 August 2016.

Group stage

Group A

Group B
Tanzania and Ethiopia tied for first place after their draw on the last match day. Tanzania were placed first then by the toss of a coin.

Knockout stage

Semi-finals

Third-place playoff

Final

Goalscorers
Top goal scorers.

6 goals
 Esse Akida
 Hasifah Nassuna

5 goals
 Loza Abera

4 goals
 Vivian Corazone
 Neddy Atieno

3 goals

 Djazilla Uwimeza
 Rehima Zergaw
 Christine Nafula
 Asha Rashid
 Stumai Abdalla
 Fazila Ikwaput

2 goals

 Maggy Mumezero
 Saidi Sakina Bukuru
 Jacky Ogol
 Mary Kinuthia
 Mwanahamisi Omari
 Otandeka Laki

1 goal

 Aziza Misigiyimana
 Joëlle Bukuru
 Nella Uwimana
 Meskerem Kanko
 Carolyne Anyango
 Mercy Achieng
 Anne Marie
 Dorothy Mukeshimana
 Sifa Gloria Nibagwire
 Donisa Daniel
 Christine Nambirige
 Abdullahi Abdallah Mwajuma

Own goal
 Anton Anastazia (playing against Rwanda)

References

2016 in women's association football
CECAFA Women's Championship
CECAFE
2016 in African football
International association football competitions hosted by Uganda